Grayvoronsky District is an administrative district (raion), one of the twenty-one in Belgorod Oblast, Russia. Municipally, it is incorporated as Grayvoronsky Municipal District. It is located in the west of the oblast. Its administrative center is the town of Grayvoron. Population:  31,567 (2002 Census). The population of Grayvoron accounts for 21.4% of the district's total population.

Geography
Grayvoronsky District sits at the southwest corner of Belgorod Oblast, on the border with Ukraine. It is bordered on the south and west by Kharkiv Oblast and Sumy Oblast (both of Ukraine), on the north by Krasnogvardeysky District, Belgorod Oblast and Rakityansky District, and on the east by Borisovsky District. The administrative center of the district is the town of Grayvoron.

The major river through the district is the Vorskla River, which flows east to west through the district, eventually to join the Dnieper River.

References

Notes

Sources

External links
Grayvoronsky District on Google Maps
Grayvoronsky District on OpenStreetMap

Districts of Belgorod Oblast